Matti Santahuhta (born 13 August 1981) is a Finnish football manager and a former footballer. He's been recently coaching FC Jazz in the Finnish third tier Kakkonen.

Santahuhta played five seasons in the Finnish premier division Veikkausliiga for FC Jazz and Tampere United. He was a member of the Finland squad at the 2001 FIFA World Youth Championship in Argentina.

References 

1981 births
Sportspeople from Pori
Finnish football managers
Finnish footballers
Finland youth international footballers
Finland under-21 international footballers
Veikkausliiga players
FC Jazz players
Tampere United players
Vaasan Palloseura players
Porin Palloilijat players
FC Jazz managers
Living people
Association football midfielders